Laufenburg is a town in Baden-Württemberg, Germany, part of the Waldshut district. It has approximately 4300 inhabitants (including 6 outskirts 8300 inhabitants). Laufenburg is separated from a Swiss city with the same name by the river Rhine.

Cities in the near vicinity

Near surrounding (<15 km): Bad Säckingen, Waldshut-Tiengen, Rickenbach (Hotzenwald), Albbruck, Murg am Hochrhein, Stein AG
Further away (>15 km): Lörrach, Basel, Brugg, Aarau, Zürich, Schaffhausen, St. Blasien, Todtmoos, Freiburg

City administration
The city of Laufenburg encompasses also Binzgen, Grunholz, Hauenstein, Hochsal, Luttingen, Rhina, Rotzel, Stadenhausen.

Brief history
The city was first noted in 1207. In November 1638 one side of the city was taken by Imperialist forces. The bridge across the Rhine was burned afterwards.

Laufenburg was one city until about 1800 when Napoleon divided the city, ordering that the Rhine should become the border.  Ever since the two cities have been separated by nationality. The city was well placed on major rapids of the Rhine, which allowed the town to collect taxes as well as catch salmon.  In the early 20th century the rapids were demolished in order to build a hydroelectric power plant.

Bridge construction
In December 2004 a new bridge was opened to the east of the city, replacing the previous bridge which had become too congested, because the roads connecting the bridge were single lane roads but were being used for two way traffic. With the opening of the new bridge a new shopping development was erected to the east of the town.

Its construction was hampered by a major engineering mistake. Switzerland and Germany use different references for sea-level: the Mediterranean Sea and North Sea respectively. While these were known to differ by  the calculations made a sign error.

References

External links
 Laufenburg (Baden)
 Laufenburg AG
 Laufenburg

Divided cities
Waldshut (district)
Baden
Germany–Switzerland border crossings
Hotzenwald
Engineering failures